St Bridget's Church is on the north side of the A595 road in the village of Calder Bridge, near Beckermet, Cumbria, England. It is an active Anglican parish church in the deanery of Calder, the archdeaconry of West Cumberland, and the diocese of Carlisle. The church is recorded in the National Heritage List for England as a designated Grade II listed building.

History
William Sowerby was ordained in 1826 becoming curate to St. Bridgets until about 1837, when he responded to an appeal by Bishop Broughton and travelled to Australia becoming the first Anglican clergyman at Goulburn.
The current St Bridget's church was built between 1840 and 1842 to a design by the Lancaster architect Edmund Sharpe. It was paid for by Thomas Irwin of Calder Abbey. The church was opened for worship in May 1842, and consecrated on 24 June 1844 by Rt Revd John Bird Sumner, Bishop of Chester. Its cost was under £1,900 (equivalent to £ in ).

Architecture

The church is constructed in local red sandstone ashlar with a slate roof. Its plan is cruciform, with a west tower, a three-bay nave, long transepts, and a short chancel, with a north vestry, and a south organ loft. The windows are lancets and around the church are buttresses. In the tower are louvred bell-openings, a corbelled parapet and pinnacles. There are clock faces on three sides of the top stage of the tower. The Pre-Raphaelite stained glass, made by Powell's and dated 1879, was designed by H. E. Wooldridge and H. J. Burrow. The memorials in the north transept include one to Thomas Irwin and his wife.

See also

Listed buildings in St. Bridget Beckermet
List of architectural works by Edmund Sharpe

References

External links
Visit Cumbria

Church of England church buildings in Cumbria
Grade II listed churches in Cumbria
Gothic Revival church buildings in England
Gothic Revival architecture in Cumbria
Churches completed in 1842
19th-century Church of England church buildings
Diocese of Carlisle
Edmund Sharpe buildings